Wotapuri-Katarqalai is an Indo-Aryan language documented to have been spoken in Afghanistan.  It is unknown if the language still has active speakers. The most recent documentation of its use was published in 1983, when it was purported that it was in use in Katar-qala but unlikely to be extant in Wotapur.

Phonology

Below is set out the phonology of the Wotapuri-Katarqalai language.

Vowels

Consonants

References

Dardic languages